"Heaven's Drive" is the sixteenth single by L'Arc-en-Ciel, released on April 21, 1999. The single sold over 634,000 copies in the first week of release. It topped the Oricon chart for two weeks and sold over one million copies. The band performed the song at the 50th Kōhaku Uta Gassen.

The length of its b-side "Metropolis ~Android Goes to Sleep Mix~" is 9 minutes 59 seconds. The song "Metropolis" was originally included in the single "Winter Fall" as the b-side.

Track listing

* Remix by Yukihiro.

References

1999 singles
L'Arc-en-Ciel songs
Oricon Weekly number-one singles
Songs written by Hyde (musician)
1999 songs
Ki/oon Music singles